Muhammad Qasim is a Pakistani politician who is currently serving as a member of the Senate of Pakistan from the Balochistan since March 2021. He belongs to Balochistan National Party (Mengal).

References

Living people
Year of birth missing (living people)
Pakistani Senators 2021–2027
Balochistan National Party (Mengal) politicians